Steve Nye is an English music producer for several artists.

Career
Nye started out as a tape op at AIR Studios in London in 1971, where producer Rupert Hine discovered him.
There he got into engineering (and later producing) many well-known artists in the music industry, including Stevie Wonder, Roxy Music and Frank Zappa.

His better known work includes artists such as Fleetwood Mac (Penguin in 1973), Bryan Ferry (In Your Mind in 1977), Penguin Cafe Orchestra, XTC (Mummer in 1983), Japan (Tin Drum in 1981), David Sylvian (Brilliant Trees in 1984, Gone to Earth in 1986, Secrets of the Beehive in 1987), Clannad, TM Network, Scary Thieves (Scary Thieves in 1984) and Frank Zappa (Joe's Garage).

In addition to engineering and producing, Nye also played keyboards. He was a member of the Penguin Cafe Orchestra from 1976 to 1988. Nye explains:

References

External links

English record producers
Living people
Penguin Cafe Orchestra members
Year of birth missing (living people)